Zan Coulibaly is a commune in the Cercle of Dioïla in the Koulikoro Region of south-western Mali. The principal town lies at Marka Coungo. In 1998 the commune had a population of 10037. The commune is known for its cotton industry.

References

Communes of Koulikoro Region